Enrico Maaßen (born 10 March 1984) is a German professional football manager and former player who is the manager of FC Augsburg.

Playing career
A FC Anker Wismar youth graduate, Maaßen only played amateur football during his entire career. He subsequently represented FC Hansa Rostock II, Greifswalder SV 04, SC Verl, Goslarer SC 08 and SV Drochtersen/Assel, retiring with the latter in 2014 at the age of 30, after suffering a serious knee injury.

Managerial career
Immediately after retiring, Maaßen was named manager of his last club SV Drochtersen/Assel. Drochtersen/Assel finidhed first and won promotion to the Regionalliga Nord during the 2014–15 Oberliga Niedersachsen season and finished fourth during the 2015–16 season. In the 2016–17 DFB-Pokal, Drochtersen/Assel were knocked out by Borussia Mönchengladbach. They finished the league season in ninth place. They finished 12th in the 2017–18 season. On 7 March 2018, after nearly four years in charge, his club confirmed that he would leave the post at the end of the season, and he was confirmed as manager of SV Rödinghausen for the 2018–19 campaign seven days later.

On 12 June 2020, Maaßen was appointed manager of Borussia Dortmund's reserve team, replacing Mike Tullberg. He renewed his contract until 2024 on 21 May of the following year, and achieved promotion to the 3. Liga with the side on 7 June 2021 after a 2–1 win over Wuppertaler SV. In the summer of 2022, he left Dortmund and joined FC Augsburg.

Coaching record

References

External links

1984 births
Living people
People from Wismar
German footballers
Association football midfielders
Oberliga (football) players
Regionalliga players
FC Anker Wismar players
Greifswalder SV 04 players
SC Verl players
Goslarer SC 08 players
German football managers
Bundesliga managers
3. Liga managers
Borussia Dortmund II managers
FC Augsburg managers
Footballers from Mecklenburg-Western Pomerania